Syed Mohammad Ali (9 December 1928 – 17 October 1993) was a Bengali journalist and editor. Ali began his career in East Pakistan. He became an editor for several newspapers in East Asia, including The Bangkok Post in Thailand, the Hong Kong Standard in British Hong Kong and The New Nation in Singapore. Ali also worked for UNESCO. In 1991, Ali founded The Daily Star in Bangladesh during the country's democratic transition.

Family
Ali was born into a Bengali Muslim family from the District of Sylhet in the Assam Province of the British Raj. He traced his paternal descent from Shah Ahmed Mutawakkil, a local holy man and a Syed of Taraf, though apparently unrelated to Taraf's ruling Syed dynasty. Ali's father was Syed Mostafa Ali, a civil servant employed by the British Raj in Assam Province. His uncles were the writers Syed Mujtaba Ali and Syed Murtaza Ali. His other siblings were Syed Muazzem Ali, a diplomat; Syed Shaukat Ally (1934–2021), a service-holder and Fowzia Ally, an academic. The Ali family hails from the Sylhet region of Bangladesh.

Career
Ali's journalistic career spanned 44 years. He started his career as a reporter for The Pakistan Observer, the largest circulated English-language daily in East Pakistan (which became The Bangladesh Observer in 1971). Ali was the Managing Editor of The Bangkok Post between 1966 and 1970. Later, he served as roving foreign editor of the Singaporean newspaper The New Nation. He became the Managing Editor of the Hong Kong Standard under British rule in Hong Kong.

Ali was also an international bureaucrat. He joined the United Nations and worked for the United Nations Educational, Scientific and Cultural Organization (UNESCO). During the 1980s, Ali and fellow UNESCO colleague Mahfuz Anam conceived the creation of a newspaper in their native country of Bangladesh.

Ali and Anam founded The Daily Star in Bangladesh during the transition from presidential government to parliamentary democracy in 1991. The period also law liberal economic reforms. The newspaper became influential for its editorials which touched on sensitive political topics. The newspaper emerged as the country's largest circulated English-language daily. Ali and Anam interviewed key political figures, including erstwhile Leader of the Opposition Sheikh Hasina. Ali also became the chairman of the Press Institute of Bangladesh (PIB). Ali served as Editor of The Daily Star until his death in 1993. In 1995, the government of Prime Minister Khaleda Zia posthumously awarded Bangladesh's highest civilian honour on Ali.

Awards
Independence Day Award, 1995

References

1928 births
1993 deaths
People from Moulvibazar District
Bangladeshi journalists
University of Dhaka alumni
Recipients of the Independence Day Award
20th-century journalists
20th-century Bengalis
Bangladeshi people of Arab descent